The 1983–84 Nationalliga A season was the 46th season of the Nationalliga A, the top level of ice hockey in Switzerland. Eight teams participated in the league, and HC Davos won the championship.

First round

Second round

1st-4th place

5th-8th place

Third round

Final round

1st-4th place

Relegation

External links
 Championnat de Suisse 1983/84

Swiss
National League (ice hockey) seasons
1983–84 in Swiss ice hockey